Macrophthalmus japonicus, the Japanese mud crab,  is a species of sentinel crab in the family Macrophthalmidae found in Asia. The taxon was described by Wilhem de Haan in 1835.

References 

Ocypodoidea
Crustaceans described in 1835